Uxbridge and South Ruislip is a constituency in Greater London represented in the House of Commons of the UK Parliament. The seat has been held by the Conservative Party since its 2010 creation. Since 2015 it has been represented by Boris Johnson, who served as Prime Minister of the United Kingdom from 2019 to 2022.

Johnson's 2017 majority in Uxbridge and South Ruislip was 5,034 votes which was less than half his 2015 majority.  After his election as Prime Minister, in the subsequent 2019 election Johnson retained the seat with an increased vote share of 52.6% and a majority of 7,210.

An estimate by the House of Commons Library puts the Leave vote by the constituency in the 2016 referendum at 57.2% and The Observer reported in August 2018 that 51.4% of voters supported Remain.

History
The Conservative party won in 2010 and 2015 by a margin of about 25%, and since 1970 the fourteen parliamentary elections in this constituency and its predecessor (the constituency of Uxbridge) were won by the Conservatives. The 2015 result gave the seat the 149th smallest majority of the Conservative Party's 331 seats by percentage of majority.

In 2010, for the Uxbridge-born Conservative candidate John Randall, the one-party swing in the seat was 0.1% greater than that seen nationally – enough on the newly drawn constituency boundaries to provide 48.3% of the vote, and a majority of more than 11,000 votes. In the 2010 and 2015 elections three (of 8 and 13 candidates respectively) attained 5% of the vote or more, to retain their deposits.

In 2014, Boris Johnson was selected to run in the seat; he was elected in 2015 with a swing of less than 1% to Labour and 50.2% of the vote. However, the 2017 election saw a 13.6% increase in Labour's vote share, although Johnson also increased his votes, which reduced Johnson's majority to only 5,034, less than half his 2015 margin and by far the lowest for a Conservative candidate in the area since 2001.

2019 election
Boris Johnson became Prime Minister of the United Kingdom on 24 July 2019 following the resignation of Theresa May. His 2017 majority in Uxbridge and South Ruislip of 5,034 votes was the smallest of any sitting prime minister since 1924. The main challenger to the seat was the Labour Party, whose 2019 candidate was Ali Milani. In April 2019, think-tank Onward classified the seat as "vulnerable" for the Conservatives, while YouGov classified the seat on 27 November 2019 as "likely Conservative".  An article in The Independent on the same date inferred a 22.2% chance of Milani winning the seat from odds by bookmaker Paddy Power. Johnson retained the seat with an increased vote share of 52.6% and an increased majority of 15%.

In 2019 two satirical candidates, Count Binface and Lord Buckethead, stood for election. Lord Buckethead appears in the 1984 movie Gremloids, and several previous UK election candidates have used the name, but Jon Harvey was prevented from standing again as Lord Buckethead after Gremloids creator Todd Durham asserted his rights over the character. Instead, Harvey stood as Count Binface and an Official Monster Raving Loony Party candidate used the name Lord Buckethead. On 6 December, Lord Buckethead encouraged constituents to vote for Labour candidate Ali Milani. Also standing was William Tobin, who aimed to receive no votes. As an expatriate who has lived abroad for 15 years, he was not able to vote in UK elections, but could stand as a candidate. Tobin stood to raise awareness of disenfranchisement of voting rights for expatriates, as well as 16- and 17-year-olds and foreign nationals who live in the UK. Tobin received five votes.

Boundaries

Most of the constituency came from that of Uxbridge, which was first established under the Redistribution of Seats Act 1885; however parts of the seat came from Ruislip-Northwood and Hayes and Harlington, both of which had been carved out of the Uxbridge seat in 1950. The 1950 changes reflected the area's growth in population since 1918, the previous national reorganisation of seats.

The boundaries of the constituency changed prior to the general election in 2010 as Parliament approved the Fifth Periodic Review of Westminster constituencies. Ickenham and parts of West Ruislip were allocated to the new seat of Ruislip, Northwood and Pinner. Treating the constituency as the direct successor to the Uxbridge seat, it gained the electoral wards:
Cavendish, South Ruislip and Manor.

The seat comprises the following electoral wards:
Brunel, Cavendish, Hillingdon East, Manor, South Ruislip, Uxbridge North, Uxbridge South, and Yiewsley in the London Borough of Hillingdon

The Boundary Commission for England 2018 review (see also Sixth Periodic Review of Westminster constituencies) provisionally recommended that the successor of the current constituency should be named Hillingdon and Uxbridge and include the following wards:

Brunel, Harefield, Hillingdon East, Ickenham, South Ruislip, Uxbridge North and Uxbridge South from the London Borough of Hillingdon and Northolt Mandeville and Northolt West End from the London Borough of Ealing

Constituency profile
The seat is in the Outer London commuter belt, is served by seven tube stations, and includes green spaces such as the Colne Valley regional park. In contrast to neighbouring Hayes and inner western suburbs, the area is without brutalist tower blocks. The highest density of buildings is found close to historic Uxbridge town centre, a hub in a seat that is ethnically diverse and prosperous, including on its outskirts Brunel University. Most of the borough electoral wards in the area vote Conservative, except for Uxbridge South, which returns Labour councillors.  Workless claimants, registered jobseekers, were in November 2012 significantly lower than the national average of 3.8%, at 2.6% of the population based on a statistical compilation by The Guardian.

The constituency voted to leave the European Union in 2016 with an estimated 57.2% of votes, according to a House of Commons Library report. In August 2018, an analysis of YouGov polling by Focaldata suggested support for Remain had risen from 43.6% to 51.4%. Boris Johnson, former Prime Minister and Member of Parliament for the constituency, is a prominent Eurosceptic politician and was a key figure of the Vote Leave campaign in the run-up to the EU referendum on 23 June 2016; which resulted in a victory for the Leave campaign when the UK electorate voted in favour of British withdrawal from the European Union.

Members of Parliament

Elections

Elections in the 2010s 
:

:

:

Source: BBC News 
* Served as an MP in the 2005–2010 Parliament

See also
List of parliamentary constituencies in London

Notes

References

External links 
Politics Resources (Election results from 1922 onwards)
Electoral Calculus (Election results from 1955 onwards)

Politics of the London Borough of Hillingdon
Parliamentary constituencies in London
Constituencies of the Parliament of the United Kingdom established in 2010
Constituencies of the Parliament of the United Kingdom represented by a sitting Prime Minister
Uxbridge
Boris Johnson